Provincial assembly elections were held in Nepal on 20 November 2022 along with the general election. 330 seats in the seven provincial assemblies will be elected by first-past-the-post voting and 220 by proportional representation.

Electoral system
The 550 members of the provincial assemblies will be elected by two methods; 330 will be elected from single-member constituencies by first-past-the-post voting and 220 seats will be elected by closed list proportional representation for parties gathering more than 1.5% of the votes. Each voter will get separate ballot papers for the two methods.

Eligibility to vote 
To vote in the general election, one must be:
 on the electoral roll
 aged 18
 a citizen of Nepal
 of sound mind
 not ineligible as per federal election fraud and punishment laws

Timetable
The key dates are listed below:

Competing parties 
In the table below, green shading indicates that the party ran a list in the indicated province. The number in each box indicates how many first-past-the-post candidates the party ran in the indicated province.

Results

Overall

Province 1

Madhesh Province

Bagmati Province

Gandaki Province

Lumbini Province

Karnali Province

Sudurpashchim Province

See also 
 2022 Nepalese local elections
 2022 Nepalese general elections

References

2022 elections in Nepal
2022
November 2022 events in Nepal
2022